Sir Donald McLean   (27 October 1820 – 5 January 1877) was a 19th-century New Zealand politician and government official. He was involved in negotiations between the settler government and Māori from 1844 to 1861, eventually as Native Secretary and Land Purchase commissioner. He was one of the most influential figures in Māori-Pākehā relations in the mid-1800s and was involved in the dispute over the "Waitara Purchase", which led up to the First Taranaki War.

Early life
He was born on the Hebridean island of Tiree, and came to New Zealand via Australia in 1840. He married Susan Douglas Strang, daughter of the registrar of the Supreme Court in Wellington, Robert Strang, on 28 August 1851. She died after giving birth to their son Douglas in December 1852 and her death deeply affected McLean; he never remarried.

Political career

McLean was involved in negotiations between the settler government and Māori from 1844 to 1861, eventually as Native Secretary and Land Purchase commissioner.  He was involved in the dispute over the "Waitara Purchase", which led up to the First Taranaki War. He was one of the most influential figures in Māori-Pākehā relations in the mid-1800s.

He was elected Superintendent of Hawke's Bay Province on 26 February 1863 and served until the end of the term on 10 January 1867. He was re-elected on 9 May 1867 and served until his resignation on 3 September 1869. In addition, he was a member of the Hawke's Bay Provincial Council, representing the Napier Country electorate in the 2nd Council (1862–1867) and the Napier Town electorate in the 3rd Council (1867–1871).

He was a Member of Parliament for the Napier electorate in the 4th to 6th Parliament, from 1866 until his death in 1877.

In 1867 he introduced the law providing for four Māori electorates in Parliament from 1868.  In the third Fox Ministry, he was Minister of Defence from 1869 to 1872 and Minister of Native Affairs.  In the Waterhouse, fourth Fox, first Vogel, Pollen, second Vogel, first Atkinson and second Atkinson Ministries, he remained Minister of Native Affairs until he resigned as a minister on 7 December 1876, shortly before he died. In 1874 he was made a Knight Commander of the Order of St Michael and St George.

The National Library of New Zealand has digitised 100,000 pages of his papers, and the collection is featured on their website.  The collection includes over 3,000 letters written to McLean by Māori from throughout New Zealand.  It is the largest surviving group of 19th-century letters in Māori.

Notes

References

External links

Biography in the 1966 Encyclopaedia of New Zealand

1820 births
1877 deaths
New Zealand Knights Commander of the Order of St Michael and St George
Members of the Cabinet of New Zealand
Members of the New Zealand House of Representatives
Superintendents of New Zealand provincial councils
New Zealand defence ministers
Scottish emigrants to New Zealand
Members of the Hawke's Bay Provincial Council
New Zealand MPs for North Island electorates
People from Argyll and Bute
19th-century New Zealand politicians
New Zealand politicians awarded knighthoods